Aeromicrobium tamlense is a Gram-positive, rod-shaped and non-motile bacterium from the genus Aeromicrobium which has been isolated from dried seaweed from Jeju Island, Korea.

References 

Propionibacteriales
Bacteria described in 2007